Nahia can refer to:

Nahia (given name), a Basque female name
Nahiyah (Nahiyah (Ottoman)), a regional or local type of administrative division in some Arabic- and Turkic-speaking countries
Nahias of Jordan